Patricia Stanley (born April 12, 1931, Cincinnati, Ohio) is a retired American actress, dancer and singer.

Career
Stanley won her Tony Award in the category of Best Featured Actress in a Musical in the 1958-1959 season, for her performances as "Lois Lee" in the musical Goldilocks. She was nominated in 1962 for a Tony Award for Best Featured Actress in a Play for her role as "Eileen Taylor" in Sunday in New York.

She made frequent appearances in prime time television on Breslin's Neighborhood, Thieves Carnival (Play of the Week 1959), Omnibus (1958), NBC Comedy Hour, The Ed Sullivan Show (1958) and A George Abbott Special (1955). On daytime television, she has played Mrs. Goodman  #2 on The Edge of Night in 1982 and 1983. In films, she was featured in the Jerry Lewis movie The Ladies Man (1961).

Personal life
Stanley was married to songwriter Johnny Burke, and later to writer William Hanley (died May 25, 2012), with whom she had two daughters, Nell and Katherine. Both marriages ended in divorce. She has three granddaughters.

Since 1980 she had been married to third husband, actor and artist Gerry Matthews. She lives in retirement in Walla Walla, Washington.

Broadway stage productions
 1952: Of Thee I Sing as dancer
 1953: Carnival in Flanders as Siska
 1957: Carousel as Carrie
 1958: Blue Denim as Lillian
 1958: Goldilocks as Lois Lee
 1959: Fiorello! as Dora 
 1961: Sunday in New York as Eileen Taylor 
 1981: The Five O'Clock Girl as Susan Snow

National Tours
 1953: Pajama Game as Gladys
 1952: A Tree Grows in Brooklyn as dance lead

Summer Stock
 1950's: Lend an Ear, Brigadoon, Pajama Game, One Touch of Venus

Night Clubs
 1980: Solo act at Once Upon a Stove

References

External links
 
 
 About Gerry Matthews
 The Museum of Un-Natural History

1931 births
Living people
Actresses from Cincinnati
American female dancers
American dancers
American women singers
American film actresses
American musical theatre actresses
American soap opera actresses
American television actresses
Tony Award winners
Dancers from New York (state)
21st-century American women